James O'Neill (July 21, 1863 – October 8, 1938) was an American actor. Before his silent film career he was a vaudeville stage actor.

Filmography
 Ben Bolt (1913) 
 The Star of India (1913)
 The Rogues of Paris (1913)
 The Fight for Millions (1913)
 The Temptations of Satan (1914)
 The Lure (1914)
 The Million Dollar Robbery (1914)
 A Fight for Freedom; Or, Exiled to Siberia (1914)
 My Madonna (1915)
 Her Own Way (1915)
 The Heart of a Painted Woman (1915)
 The Honor of Mary Blake (1916)
 The Traveling Salesman (1916)
 The Raggedy Queen (1917)
 House of Cards (1917)
 The Boy Girl (1917)
 Miss Arizona (1919)
 The Whisper Market (1920)
 The Courage of Marge O'Doone (1920)
 Captain Swift (1920)
 The Kickback (1922) 
 Sitting Bull at the Spirit Lake Massacre (1927)

References

External links

1863 births
1938 deaths
Male actors from Pennsylvania
20th-century American male actors